NGC 4540 is a spiral galaxy with type 1 Seyfert activity located about 64 million light-years away in the constellation Coma Berenices. NGC 4540 was discovered by astronomer William Herschel on March 21, 1784 and is a member of the Virgo Cluster.

See also 
 List of NGC objects (4001–5000)

References

External links

Coma Berenices
Intermediate spiral galaxies
Seyfert galaxies
4540
41876
7742
Astronomical objects discovered in 1784
Virgo Cluster
Discoveries by William Herschel